Television in Portugal was introduced in 1956 (test broadcasts) by Radiotelevisão Portuguesa (now named Rádio e Televisão de Portugal), which held the nationwide television monopoly until late 1992. Regular broadcasting was introduced on March 7, 1957. Colour transmissions were introduced on March 10, 1980.

Digital terrestrial television (DTT) was introduced at a very late stage when compared to other countries in Europe and with limited channels, and according to the European Audiovisual Observatory it occupies the last place in 34 European countries with the weakest offer on digital terrestrial television, in such a way that most Portuguese are subscribers of cable (HFC) or IPTV (DSL or FTTH) platforms, in percentages higher than in the rest of Europe and these platforms are well developed with many channels. During the transition from analog to DTT, subscription-based television services experienced a 10% increase and reached 72.5% of homes in 2012. Outside of the internet, there are no regional or local television channels - with the exception of the autonomous state TV channels, RTP Açores and RTP Madeira -, although a couple of pay TV channels are partly or wholly dedicated to regional matters.  Portuguese television is regulated by the Entidade Reguladora para a Comunicação Social (ERC).

History
In 1953, a group on behalf of Emissora Nacional de Radiodifusão (later RDP) was set up examining the feasibility of a television service in Portugal. The group started a preliminary work for a network of television signals, with a budget on the order of 500,000 escudos. A foreign company had a proposal for the setup of the television network, including the possibility by a foreign company, with high foreign capital, tasking up a proposal for the building of the network and having the exclusive rights of the selling of television sets in the country for a determined period of time In July 1954, their report A Televisão em Portugal (Television in Portugal) was published and was built upon the following pillars:
1. The current status of TV and the opportunity for its introduction in Portugal
2. The operating system to be adopted
3. The solution that seems possible
4. Outline of an initial plan and related charges
5. Economic study
6. List of work already carried out by ENR.

On March 7, 1957 public broadcaster Rádio e Televisão de Portugal (RTP) began broadcasting RTP1, the first television channel in the country. A second RTP channel, RTP2, started broadcasting on December 25, 1968. Private commercial channels were launched in the early 1990s, with SIC on October 6, 1992 and TVI on February 20, 1993. In 2012, the 24-hour television news channel TVI 24 was revamped and started to broadcast as CNN Portugal. In December 2021, Lisbon-headquartered investment management firm Alpac Capital signed an agreement to buy a controlling stake in the pan-European television news network Euronews from Egyptian telecoms magnate Naguib Sawiris.

Terrestrial 

Analog broadcasts in Portugal were discontinued on April 26, 2012. There are eight free-to-air channels on Portuguese terrestrial TV: 6 are owned by the public service broadcaster RTP (with 2 being regional channels that broadcast FTA only in the Madeira and Azores Autonomous Regions), two are from private broadcasters (SIC and TVI) and one is owned by the Assembly of the Republic and broadcasts parliamentary sessions (like BBC Parliament).
See Digital terrestrial television in Portugal

List of free-to-air terrestrial channels

Nationwide channels 
  ARtv (Portugal): a public TV channel that broadcasts the sessions of Assembly of the Republic. The least watched terrestrial channel in Portugal.
 RTP1: the flagship channel of RTP, the Portuguese public broadcasting corporation, and presents a general programming composed mainly by news, talk shows, discussion-based programs, national and international fiction and drama and entertainment. It is the third most watched TV channel in Portugal from 2001 to 2006, 2008, and again from 2011 to present. In the 37 years since its inception in 1957, it was the most watched channel in Portugal until 1995 when SIC overtook it, putting it at second place until 2001 (and again in 2007 and from 2009 to 2010).
 RTP2: the second channel of Portuguese television.  It focuses more on intellectual and cultural programming, as well as children and documentary programs. It is the only terrestrial channel in Portugal that broadcasts international (mostly American) TV-series during the prime-time.
 RTP3: a news channel from RTP.
 RTP Memória: archive programming from RTP and classic programming from various worldwide broadcasters (ranging from BBC's 'Allo 'Allo! to FOX's The X-Files).
 SIC: The first private television station in Portugal. It broadcasts mainly Brazilian telenovelas and long talk shows (more than 8 hours every day), talent shows, as well as themed programming. Like competitor TVI, SIC does not broadcast many international TV-series during prime-time. It was the second most watched channel for 13 years (save for 2007, 2009, and 2010 when it was at third place) until 2019, when it overtook TVI for the number 1 position. Prior to that, SIC was number 1 from 1995 to 2004, breaking RTP1's long-standing lead.
 TVI: The second private station in Portugal. It focuses mainly on Portuguese telenovelas (usually 5 or more in production at the same time), as well as talk-shows. These talk-shows account for more than 45% of TVI's programming and concentrate mainly on human interest stories, while the other 55% comprises telenovelas. It is also well known for its popular reality shows. The primary target audience of TVI are housewives and the elderly. For over 13 years since 2005 (when it overtook the once-dominant SIC), it reigned as the most watched channel in Portugal before relinquishing the position again to SIC in 2019.

Regionals channels 
 RTP Açores: Regional Public broadcaster broadcasting only in Azores.
 RTP Madeira: Regional Public broadcaster broadcasting only in Madeira.

HD broadcasts 
As of worldwide sport events, the common broadcasters usually start a temporary HD channel for subscription digital television users.

 For the UEFA Euro 2008, TVI launched TVI HD to broadcast the event in HD (although you could also see the channel 24 hours).
 Also for the UEFA Euro 2008, SportTV launched an HD simulcast of SportTV 1.
 For the Beijing Olympics 2008, RTP has launched RTP HD, but this one had non-continuous programming, broadcasting only the Olympics (which come to air very late night) and some RTP2 sports programing during the day, pausing in the morning to around 15 (3 p.m) for Desporto 2 and then stopping again until 21 (9 p.m) to show prime-time during the week and movies during weekend. Night was filled with the Olympics from 0 to 2 (12 am to 2 am) with reruns and 2 to 7 am with live events. 
MOV also launched a HD channel in 2008.
 In the beginning of 2009 the all-native HD SportTV HD started broadcasting. 
 Also in 2009, RTP relaunched RTP HD, now with a different name, RTP1 HD, with regular broadcast.
 SIC also start test broadcasts in 2009, with UEFA Europa League broadcasts but didn't proceed. They began broadcasting all their channels in HD on October 6, 2016, they day of the 24th anniversary of the first official broadcasts of SIC.
 Thematic channels, AXN, FOX, FOX Life, TVCine, Syfy Universal, also started their HD broadcasts in 2009.
 A HD channel was present on Digital Terrestrial Television but has never broadcast.

IPTV 
Optimus Clix has launched in 2006 a service called SmarTV (rebranded as Optimus Clix TV), provided on Amino and Motorola STBs, with VoD provided by Kasenna MediaBase video servers. PT Comunicações (Portugal Telecom) has also launched one called MEO, providing that the spin-off of subsidiary PT Multimédia was concluded. Vodafone also launched an IPTV service called Vodafone Casa TV.

Cable 
All cable providers in Portugal introduced digital television (DVB-C).

Satellite 
Digital satellite services have existed since 1998. Currently, the providers are NOS and MEO operating in Hispasat.

Mobile TV 
All operators had mobile TV under UMTS platforms. It was abandoned in favor of web-TV applications for mobile devices.

Most-viewed channels

Yearly viewing shares
Yearly average viewing shares of the five main television channels in Portugal since 1992:

Monthly viewing shares
Monthly viewing shares in February 2023:

Most watched shows

Age ratings

See also
List of Portuguese language television channels
List of television stations in Portugal
 Media of Portugal
 List of newspapers in Portugal
 List of radio stations in Portugal
 Telecommunications in Portugal

References

Bibliography

External links
Lei da Televisão (Television law) 
CAEM